Bhagyalakshmi, also known as Bhagyasri is an Indian actress. She was a prominent actress in the 1980's, appearing in nearly 60 films in Malayalam, Tamil, Kannada, and Telugu films.

Personal life
Bhagyalakshmi was born in an Aristocratic  Tamil Brahmin family to Shivaram Iyer and Rajamani Ammal in Chennai. Her father was a Palakkad Iyer from Palakkad, while her mother was a Saurashtra brahmin from Karaikudi. She has a younger brother Rohith Kumar, who is an engineer. She studied at Sacred Heart Matriculation School, now known as Presentation Convent, at Church Park, until the 10th grade, after which she dropped out of school to pursue an acting career. She learned classical dance from the Dhananjayans.

Her first Tamil movie was Deviyin Thiruvilayadal in 1982, and her first Malayalam movie was Asthram in 1983.

She married film producer Vasudevan Mannadiyar, a Malayali from Gujarat involved in the garment business, on 14 April 2001. They have a son, Viswajith. After her marriage Bhagyalakshmi retired from acting in the film industry and settled in Gujarat for 14 years. They currently reside in Chennai.

Filmography

Television

References

5,https://www.manoramaonline.com/homestyle/spot-light/2018/11/29/bhagyasree-home-memories.html

External links
 

Actresses in Malayalam cinema
Indian film actresses
Actresses in Tamil cinema
Actresses in Kannada cinema
Actresses in Telugu cinema
20th-century Indian actresses
21st-century Indian actresses
Living people
Actresses in Tamil television
1972 births